Lagoa Mangueira is a lagoon located in the state of the Rio Grande Do Sul, in southern Brazil.

Lagoa Mangueira is 123 kilometers long and has a total area of 800 square kilometers. It is located in the municipality of Santa Vitória do Palmar. It is more than 500 kilometers from the state capital, Porto Alegre, almost on the border with Uruguay, with no urban concentrations nearby.

References 

Mangueira